Hojai Girls' College, established in 1991, is a general degree women's college situated in Hojai, Assam. This college is affiliated with the Gauhati University. This college offers different bachelor's degree courses in arts.

References

External links

Women's universities and colleges in Assam
Colleges affiliated to Gauhati University
Educational institutions established in 1991
1991 establishments in Assam
Colleges in Assam